The Bantiger is a mountain north of the Emmental Alps, overlooking the region of Bern. It is located east of Ittigen and north of Stettlen, in the canton of Bern.

The Bantiger TV Tower, on the summit, is a 196 metre tall tower used for FM- and TV-transmission.

References

External links

Bantiger on Hikr

Mountains of the Alps
Mountains of Switzerland
Mountains of the canton of Bern
Emmental Alps
Mountains of Switzerland under 1000 metres